Blake Caracella (born 15 March 1977) is a former Australian rules footballer who played in the Australian Football League (AFL). He is currently serving as an assistant coach with the Essendon Football Club. He is the brother of Craig Caracella.

AFL career

Essendon
Selected by Essendon in the 1994 National draft at pick 10, Caracella finally debuted with the Bombers in 1997. What had held him back was his lack of bulk—he came to the club weighing only 74 kg—however, he rectified this by pushing his playing weight up to 83 kg prior to his AFL debut. Caracella quickly established himself in the side as a skilful small forward/goalsneak, who had patience and poise. He earned himself an AFL Rising Star nomination for his work.

He was a vital part of Essendon's premiership win in 2000, contributing 35 goals for the season. At the end of 2002, he was controversially traded to the Brisbane Lions.

Brisbane
Caracella's stay in Brisbane only lasted two years, during which he played 34 games, including the Lions' 2003 premiership-winning team and also their unsuccessful 2004 AFL Grand Final side.
Reasons cited for his trade from both Essendon and Brisbane was to ease the strain of salary cap restrictions at both clubs.

Collingwood
Caracella was selected by Collingwood in the 2005 pre-season draft, the team that he supported as a child.

In 2005, Caracella had a solid year at Collingwood (apart from a lean patch in the final seven rounds where he only managed three goals, as well as missing Round 20), booting 34 goals in total and finished tenth in the Copeland Trophy.

Injury and retirement
In 2006, Caracella suffered a career-ending neck injury.  Whilst contesting a loose ball against the Lions, Caracella slipped, and former teammate Tim Notting's hip accidentally collected his head, fracturing several vertebrae and bruising his spinal cord.  At the time, field umpire Brett Allen did not consider the contact sufficient to award a free kick for high contact. The injury horrified the football community, drawing comparisons to the quadriplegia suffered by Footscray's Neil Sachse in the 1970s.

On Wednesday, 2 August, Caracella announced his retirement. At the press conference, Caracella revealed that scans had shown his spinal column was naturally narrower than average. This condition would have ruled out a career in any professional contact sport had it been diagnosed earlier.

Statistics

|- style="background-color: #EAEAEA"
! scope="row" style="text-align:center" | 1997
|style="text-align:center;"|
| 33 || 17 || 25 || 18 || 187 || 103 || 290 || 84 || 15 || 1.5 || 1.1 || 11.0 || 6.1 || 17.1 || 4.9 || 0.9
|-
! scope="row" style="text-align:center" | 1998
|style="text-align:center;"|
| 33 || 16 || 13 || 7 || 149 || 97 || 246 || 78 || 24 || 0.8 || 0.4 || 9.3 || 6.1 || 15.4 || 4.9 || 1.5
|-style="background:#eaeaea;"
! scope="row" style="text-align:center" | 1999
|style="text-align:center;"|
| 33 || 24 || 31 || 26 || 210 || 122 || 332 || 77 || 26 || 1.3 || 1.1 || 8.8 || 5.1 || 13.8 || 3.2 || 1.1
|-
! scope="row" style="text-align:center" | 2000
|style="text-align:center;"|
| 33 || 24 || 35 || 17 || 270 || 219 || 489 || 138 || 43 || 1.5 || 0.7 || 11.3 || 9.1 || 20.4 || 5.8 || 1.8
|-style="background:#eaeaea;"
! scope="row" style="text-align:center" | 2001
|style="text-align:center;"|
| 33 || 21 || 25 || 11 || 256 || 177 || 433 || 120 || 29 || 1.2 || 0.5 || 12.2 || 8.4 || 20.6 || 5.7 || 1.4
|-
! scope="row" style="text-align:center" | 2002
|style="text-align:center;"|
| 33 || 24 || 22 || 14 || 287 || 151 || 438 || 111 || 43 || 0.9 || 0.6 || 12.0 || 6.3 || 18.3 || 4.6 || 1.8
|-style="background:#eaeaea;"
! scope="row" style="text-align:center" | 2003
|style="text-align:center;"|
| 1 || 18 || 17 || 16 || 177 || 95 || 272 || 86 || 33 || 0.9 || 0.9 || 9.8 || 5.3 || 15.1 || 4.8 || 1.8
|-
! scope="row" style="text-align:center" | 2004
|style="text-align:center;"|
| 1 || 16 || 16 || 11 || 139 || 86 || 225 || 61 || 25 || 1.0 || 0.7 || 8.7 || 5.4 || 14.1 || 3.8 || 1.6
|-style="background:#eaeaea;"
! scope="row" style="text-align:center" | 2005
|style="text-align:center;"|
| 10 || 21 || 34 || 19 || 155 || 101 || 256 || 88 || 22 || 1.6 || 0.9 || 7.4 || 4.8 || 12.2 || 4.2 || 1.0
|-
! scope="row" style="text-align:center" | 2006
|style="text-align:center;"|
| 10 || 6 || 0 || 2 || 65 || 44 || 109 || 33 || 8 || 0.0 || 0.3 || 10.8 || 7.3 || 18.2 || 5.5 || 1.3
|- class="sortbottom"
! colspan=3| Career
! 187
! 218
! 141
! 1895
! 1195
! 3090
! 876
! 268
! 1.2
! 0.8
! 10.1
! 6.4
! 16.5
! 4.7
! 1.4
|}

Coaching career

In September 2016, he accepted a position as an assistant coach at  under former teammate Damien Hardwick.

On 6 August 2019, the Essendon Football Club announced Caracella would be joining their coaching department for the 2020 season.

References

External links

Australian rules footballers from Melbourne

Collingwood Football Club players
Brisbane Lions players
Brisbane Lions Premiership players
Essendon Football Club players
Essendon Football Club Premiership players
1977 births
Living people
Australian people of Italian descent
Northern Knights players
Australia international rules football team players
Two-time VFL/AFL Premiership players